General elections were held in the British Virgin Islands on 16 June 2003. It was won by the opposition National Democratic Party (NDP), which took 54.4% of the vote and 8 of the 13 available seats on the Legislative Council.  After the election the NDP formed a Government for the first time in its history. Both major parties - the NDP and the Virgin Islands Party (VIP) actually increased their share of the overall vote at the expense of minority parties and independents.  No independents or any minority parties won any seats.  The NDP won all four of the territorial-at-large seats.

Results
The NDP's victory was largely as a result of sweeping all four of the At-large seats.  However, with each voter being able to cast four votes per ballot, the margin between the bottom NDP candidate (Paul Wattley) and the top VIP candidate (Reeial George) was a mere 41 votes, out of a total of 7,351 ballots cast (a margin of 0.5%).  The other key win for the NDP was in the Fifth District where Delores Christopher carried the seat for the NDP by a wafer thin margin of just 3 votes in a constituency where a total of 20 ballots were rejected by elections officers.

Voters exercised a largely binary choice between the two main parties.  No third party candidate or independent polled well in any area.  In the Territorial seats, Alred Frett in the Fifth District was the highest vote-getter, with a mere 7.1% of the votes.  In the At-large seats, the top eight spots went to the four candidates for each of the two main parties, with a massive drop off in numbers of votes for the ninth place candidate (Conrad Maduro, a former elected representative on the United Party ticket, but running in 2003 as an independent).

Individual territorial seats
The winning candidate is highlighted in blue.  The previous incumbent is indicated in bold.

First Electoral District

Total number of registered voters: 1,154
Total number of votes cast: 787
Percentage of voters who voted: 68.2%

Second Electoral District

Total number of registered voters: 1,105
Total number of votes cast: 742
Percentage of voters who voted: 67.0%

Third Electoral District

Total number of registered voters: 1,058
Total number of votes cast: 805
Percentage of voters who voted: 76.1%

Fourth Electoral District

Total number of registered voters: 1,172
Total number of votes cast: 860
Percentage of voters who voted: 73.4%

Fifth Electoral District

Total number of registered voters: 1,222
Total number of votes cast: 798
Percentage of voters who voted: 65.3%

Sixth Electoral District

Total number of registered voters: 1,289
Total number of votes cast: 889
Percentage of voters who voted: 69%

Seventh Electoral District

Total number of registered voters: 941
Total number of votes cast: 720
Percentage of voters who voted: 76.5%

Eighth Electoral District

Total number of registered voters: 1,010
Total number of votes cast: 787
Percentage of voters who voted: 77.9%

Ninth Electoral District

Total number of registered voters: 1,233
Total number of votes cast: 980
Percentage of voters who voted: 79.5%

At-large seats

Territorial At-Large Electoral District

Total ballots cast: 7,351
Total rejected ballots: 15
Total votes rejected: 14
Total valid votes: 29,194
Total votes counted: 29,208
Total registered voters: 10,180
Percentage turnout: 72.21%

References
BVI News online

Elections in the British Virgin Islands
British Virgin Islands
General election
British Virgin Islands
June 2003 events in North America